Allan Hope (19 February 1903 – 2 August 1984) was an Australian rules footballer who played for the Melbourne Football Club in the Victorian Football League (VFL).

Notes

External links 

1903 births
1984 deaths
Australian rules footballers from Victoria (Australia)
Melbourne Football Club players